William Thomas "Champion Jack" Dupree (July 23, 1909 or July 4, 1910 – January 21, 1992) was an American blues and boogie-woogie pianist and singer. His nickname was derived from his early career as a boxer.

Biography
Dupree was a New Orleans blues and boogie-woogie pianist, a barrelhouse "professor". His father was from the Belgian Congo and his mother was part African American and Cherokee. His birth date has been given as July 4, July 10, and July 23, 1908, 1909, or 1910; the researchers Bob Eagle and Eric LeBlanc give July 4, 1910.

He was orphaned at the age of eight and sent to the Colored Waifs Home in New Orleans, an institution for orphaned or delinquent boys (about six years previously, Louis Armstrong had also been sent to the Home, after being arrested as a "dangerous and suspicious character"). Dupree taught himself to play the piano there and later apprenticed with Tuts Washington and Willie Hall, whom he called his father and from whom he learned "Junker's Blues". He was also a "spy boy" for the Yellow Pocahontas tribe of the Mardi Gras Indians. He soon began playing in barrelhouses and other drinking establishments.

He began a life of travelling, living in Chicago, where he worked with Georgia Tom, and in Indianapolis, Indiana, where he met Scrapper Blackwell and Leroy Carr. He also worked as a cook. In Detroit, after Joe Louis encouraged him to become a boxer, he fought 107 bouts, winning Golden Gloves and other championships and picking up the nickname Champion Jack, which he used the rest of his life.

He returned to Chicago at the age of 30 and joined a circle of recording artists, including Big Bill Broonzy and Tampa Red, who introduced him to the record producer Lester Melrose. Many of Dupree's songs were later credited to Melrose as composer, and Melrose claimed publishing rights to them.

Dupree's career was interrupted by military service in World War II. He was a cook in the United States Navy and was held by the Japanese for two years as a prisoner of war. Following Franklin D. Roosevelt's death in office, Dupree composed the "F.D.R. Blues".

After the war, his biggest commercial success was "Walkin' the Blues", which he recorded as a duet with Teddy McRae. This led to several national tours and eventually a European tour. In 1959, he played an unofficial (and unpaid) duo gig with Alexis Korner at the London School of Economics.

Dupree moved to Europe in 1960, settling first in Switzerland and then Denmark (in the anarchist-occupied Freetown Christiania in Copenhagen), England, Sweden and, finally, Germany.  On June 17, 1971, he played at the Montreux Jazz Festival, in the Casino Kursaal, with King Curtis, backed by Cornell Dupree on guitar, Jerry Jemmott on bass and Oliver Jackson on drums. The recording of the concert was released in 1973 as the album King Curtis & Champion Jack Dupree: Blues at Montreux on the Atlantic label.

In the 1970s and 1980s, he lived at Ovenden in Halifax, England, after marrying a Halifax native, Shirley Ann Harrison, whom he met in London. A piano he used was later discovered at Calderdale College in Halifax. He continued to record in Europe with the Kenn Lending Band, Louisiana Red and Axel Zwingenberger and made many live appearances. He also worked again as a cook, specializing in New Orleans cuisine. He returned to the United States from time to time and performed at the New Orleans Jazz & Heritage Festival.

He divorced Shirley in 1976 and moved to Copenhagen, where he lived in the Freetown Christiania. This period of his life was the subject of the 1975 film Barrelhouse Blues - Feelings and Situations by the artists Laurie Grundt and Eva Acking which includes several filmed performances, including one where Dupree plays drum set. He later moved to Zurich and finally settled in Hanover, Germany. He died of cancer on January 21, 1992, in Hanover.

Musical style and output
Dupree's playing was almost all straight blues and boogie-woogie. He was not a sophisticated musician or singer, but he had a wry and clever way with words: "Mama, move your false teeth, papa wanna scratch your gums." He sometimes sang as if he had a cleft palate and even recorded under the name Harelip Jack Dupree. This was an artistic conceit, as he had clear articulation, particularly for a blues singer. He would occasionally indulge in a vocalese style of sung word play (similar to Slim Gaillard's "Vout"), as in his "Mr. Dupree Blues", included on the album The Complete Blue Horizon Sessions.

Many of his songs were about jail, drinking and drug addiction, although he himself was a light drinker and did not use other drugs. His "Junker's Blues" was transmuted by Fats Domino into "The Fat Man", Domino's first hit record. Some of Dupree's songs had gloomy topics, such as "TB Blues" and "Angola Blues" (about Louisiana State Penitentiary, the infamous Louisiana prison farm), but he also sang about cheerful subjects, as in "Dupree Shake Dance": "Come on, mama, on your hands and knees, do that shake dance as you please". He was a noted raconteur and transformed many of his stories into songs, such as "Big Leg Emma's", a rhymed tale of a police raid on a barrelhouse.

The lyrics of Jerry Lee Lewis's version of "Whole Lotta Shakin' Goin' On"—"You can shake it one time for me!"—echo Dupree's song "Shake Baby Shake".

On his best-known album, Blues from the Gutter, released by Atlantic Records in 1958, he was accompanied on guitar by Larry Dale, whose playing on that record inspired Brian Jones of the Rolling Stones.

In later years Dupree recorded with John Mayall, Mick Taylor, Eric Clapton and The Band.

Although best known as a singer and pianist in the New Orleans style, Dupree occasionally pursued more musically adventurous projects, including Dupree 'N' McPhee: The 1967 Blue Horizon Session, a collaboration with the English guitarist Tony McPhee, recorded for Blue Horizon (record label).

Since his death, Dupree has undergone a revival of interest on the British vintage dance scene.  His recording of “Shakin’ Mother for You” now features on the playlist of most DJ’s on the UK Lindy Hop scene and it has become the de facto standard track for the ‘Cardiff Stroll’.

Discography

Studio albums
Blues from the Gutter (Atlantic, 1958)
Champion Jack's Natural & Soulful Blues (Atlantic, 1959)
Champion of the Blues (Atlantic, 1961)
The Women Blues of Champion Jack Dupree (Folkways, 1961)
Trouble, Trouble (Storyville, 1962)
The Best of the Blues (Storyville, 1963)
Champion Jack Dupree Of New Orleans (Storyville, 1965)
From New Orleans to Chicago (Decca, 1966)
When You Feel the Feeling You Was Feeling (Blue Horizon, 1968) with Paul Kossoff, guitar; Duster Bennett, harmonica; Simon Kirke, drums
Scoobydoobydoo (Blue Horizon, 1969, UK), also released as Blues Masters, Vol. 10 (Blue Horizon, 1972)
The Heart of the Blues Is Sound (BYG, 1969)
The Incredible Champion Jack Dupree (Sonet, 1970), 12 tracks recorded in Copenhagen in 1960-63.
The Hamburg Session (Happy Bird, 1974)
Champion Jack Dupree "1977" (Isadora, 1977), also released as Hamhark & Limer Beans
Back Home in New Orleans (Bullseye Blues, 1990)
Forever and Ever (Bullseye Blues, 1991)
One Last Time (Bullseye Blues, 1993)

Live albums
Champion Jack Dupree (Festival, 1971)
Alive, "Live" and Well (Chrischaa, 1976)
The Blues Jubilee Album (Pinorrekk, 1984)
Live at Burnley (JSP, 1989)
Jivin' with Jack: Live in Manchester, May 1966 (Jasmine, 2002)
Bad Luck Blues: Live with Freeway 75 (Bad Luck Blues, 2003)

Collaborations
Champion Jack Dupree And His Blues Band featuring Mickey Baker (Decca, 1967)
Tricks, with Mickey Baker (Vogue, 1968), also released as Anthologie du Blues, Vol. 1 (Disques Vogue, 1968, France)
I'm Happy to Be Free, with Mickey Baker and Hal Singer (Vogue, 1971)
Blues at Montreux, with King Curtis (Atlantic, 1973)
Freedom, with the Monty Sunshine band (Pinorrekk, 1980)
Real Combination, with Henry Ojutkangas (Dig It, 1980)
I Had That Dream, with Kenn Lending (Pinorrekk, 1982)
Get You An Ol' Man, with Brenda Bell and Louisiana Red (Paris, 1984)
Rockin' The Boogie, with Kenn Lending (Blue Moon, 1988)
Sings Blues Classics, with Axel Zwingenberger (Vagabond, 1990)

References

External links
 
 Illustrated Champion Jack Dupree discography (lists 185 separate records, 1940–2010)
 Barrelhouse Blues: Feelings and Situations a 1975 film by Jack Dupree, Eva Acking and Laurie Grunt, Dansk Filmcentrum, at vimeo.com
 

20th-century births
1992 deaths
American blues pianists
American male pianists
Boogie-woogie pianists
Chicago blues musicians
Blues musicians from New Orleans
American expatriates in the United Kingdom
American rhythm and blues musicians
American street performers
African-American pianists
Jazz musicians from New Orleans
King Records artists
Groove Records artists
Charly Records artists
Apollo Records artists
American prisoners of war in World War II
Rhythm and blues musicians from New Orleans
20th-century American pianists
Jazz musicians from Illinois
20th-century American male musicians
American male jazz musicians
20th-century African-American musicians